Emmanuel McDaniel (born July 27, 1972) is a former professional American football cornerback who played seven seasons in the National Football League for the Carolina Panthers, Indianapolis Colts, New York Giants, Miami Dolphins and the Arizona Cardinals.  He played college football at East Carolina University and was drafted by the Panthers in the fourth round of the 1996 NFL Draft.

McDaniel was a four-year letterman (1992-1995) for the East Carolina Pirates before moving onto the National Football League. He ended his Pirate tenure with 112 tackles and 13 interceptions, pacing the Pirates in that category from 1993-1995 (2 in 1993, 5 in 1994, and 6 in 1995). He is tied in East Carolina Pirates record book for career high interception for a touchdown with two. As a college senior, he earned First-team All-South Independent honors. 

McDaniel’s professional career began with the Carolina Panthers, who selected him with the 111th pick of the fourth round in the 1996 NFL draft. As a defensive back and special teams standout, he spent seven years in the National Football League with the Carolina Panthers (1996, 2002), Indianapolis Colts (1997), Miami Dolphins (1998), New York Giants (1999-2001), and the Arizona Cardinals (2003). 

He ended his professional career with 161 tackles, 32 passes defended and nine interceptions. McDaniel had six interceptions in 2000, when he helped the New York Giants to a 12-4 regular-season record. 

The Jonesboro, Georgia native is one of 14 East Carolina Pirates to be on the active roster for a Super Bowl team, earning a starting nod as the nickel back in Super Bowl XXXV against the Baltimore Ravens. A week prior to Super Bowl XXXV, McDaniel was named the New York Giants Defensive Player-of-the-Game in a 41-0 victory over the Minnesota Vikings in the NFC Championship Game. 

After ending his player career, McDaniel took time away from the game to be with his newborn son until the 2006 season, when he volunteered in the Akron Zips football office. From 2007-2009, he served as the Akron Zips football Cornerback Coach, guiding two players to All Mid-American Conference honors. 

McDaniel also worked for the East Carolina Pirates as a Strength and Conditioning Coach from 2011 -2014.

McDaniel received a Bachelor of Art in Criminal Justice from East Carolina University in 1995.

References

1972 births
Living people
American football cornerbacks
East Carolina Pirates football players
Carolina Panthers players
Indianapolis Colts players
New York Giants players
Arizona Cardinals players
People from Griffin, Georgia
Akron Zips football coaches